Peach Kelli Pop II  is the second album by the Canadian/American Rock band Peach Kelli Pop, released in 2012 on Burger Records. This was Peach Kelli Pop’s first album with Burger Records.

Track listing

Production
Kenneth Maclaurin  – album design
Chilimac  – cover photo
Seth Sutton  – back photo

References

1. http://peachkellipop.com/collections/music/products/peach-kelli-pop-ii

2012 albums